Duck Amuck is an American animated surreal comedy short film directed by Chuck Jones and written by Michael Maltese. The short was released on January 17, 1953, as part of the Merrie Melodies series, and stars Daffy Duck.

In the cartoon, Daffy Duck is tormented by an unseen, mischievous animator, who constantly changes Daffy's locations, clothing, voice, physical appearance, and even shape, much to Daffy's aggravation, embarrassment, and finally rage. Pandemonium reigns throughout the cartoon as Daffy attempts to steer the action back to some kind of normality, only for the animator to either ignore him or, more frequently, to over-literally interpret his increasingly frantic demands. In the end, the tormenting animator is revealed to be Bugs Bunny.

In 1994, it was voted #2 of The 50 Greatest Cartoons of all time by members of the animation field, losing only to What's Opera, Doc?, also directed by Jones and written by Maltese. In 1999, Duck Amuck was added to the National Film Registry for being  "culturally, historically, or aesthetically significant."

The short was included on the Looney Tunes Golden Collection: Volume 1 DVD box set (with optional audio commentary by historian Michael Barrier), The Essential Daffy Duck DVD box set, and the Looney Tunes Platinum Collection: Volume 1 Blu-ray box set. The short inspired the 2007 Nintendo DS game Looney Tunes: Duck Amuck.

Plot 
The cartoon's title sequence and opening scene suggest Daffy Duck is to star as a musketeer, and he appears, boldly engaging in an action scene with a fencing foil. As he thrusts the foil and advances, the background abruptly disappears, leaving a plain white screen. Confused by this, Daffy turns to the animator and asks them to complete the scenery. However, the animator fills in a new background that has nothing to do with the previous scene. Daffy returns and starts to repeat his opening scene, but quickly notices the different background and leaves, returning in a different costume and altering his performance to match the new scene. The animator substitutes several different unrelated backgrounds, each time prompting Daffy to change costumes until the background finally disappears completely again.

While Daffy tries to reason with the animator, he becomes completely erased and, upon asking where he is, he gets redrawn as a cowboy with a guitar. Daffy tries to play it, but there is only silence. Using a sign ("sound please"), he requests sound and is granted various non-guitar sound effects. Daffy also finds himself generating random sound effects when he tries to speak, and finally regains his voice when he becomes enraged and shouts angrily at the animator.

Regaining his composure, Daffy demands some new scenery and is given an amateurish line-art cityscape background in pencil. Daffy unpleasantly asks for color, prompting the animator to slap various colors and patterns all over him, for which he harshly scolds the animator. All but Daffy's eyes and beak is erased and, upon asking where the rest of him has gone, he is redrawn as a bizarre mismatched creature. As Daffy walks off, he becomes aware of not feeling quite like himself; the animator creates a mirror and, upon seeing his hideous self, Daffy shrieks in alarm before scolding the animator again. Everything is erased and Daffy is redrawn this time in a sailor suit. Daffy seems to be pleased with this and begins to sing "The Song of the Marines" as the animator draws an ocean scene with an island in the background, but draws nothing under Daffy, resulting in him falling into the ocean and surfacing on the island. When he requests a close-up, the screen contracts around him, at which he says that is not a close-up and screams for a proper close-up; the camera zooms up uncomfortably close to his angry bloodshot eyes. He walks away muttering a sarcastic thanks to the animator.

As Daffy tries once again to negotiate with the animator to have an understanding, a black curtain falls on him. After failing to keep the curtain up with a stick (and trying to push the curtain up), Daffy goes ballistic and rips it apart. Now at the end of his rope, Daffy demands for the cartoon to resume, only to become even more frustrated when the animator attempts to end it. Daffy suggests that he and the animator go their separate ways and, hoping against hope that nothing further will happen, begins a dance routine which is quickly interrupted when the film runs out of alignment, resulting in two Daffys on the screen. They argue with each other and almost start a fight, but one Daffy is quickly erased just before the other attempts to get physical.

Daffy is then drawn into an airplane, which he excitedly flies around in until a mountain is drawn in his path. The plane crashes into it (off-screen), leaving Daffy with nothing but the plane's steering wheel and windshield. He jumps out of the plane's remains and floats downward with his parachute, which is replaced with an anvil. Crashing to the ground, a disoriented Daffy hammers the anvil while dizzily reciting "The Village Blacksmith". The animator changes the anvil into an artillery shell, which explodes after a few more hammer strikes. Daffy finally snaps and angrily demands to know who the animator is, only to have the animator draw a door and closes it on Daffy. The camera pulls back and the animator is revealed to be Bugs Bunny at a drawing table, who turns around and says to the audience: "Ain't I a stinker?"

Voice cast and additional crew 
 Mel Blanc voices Daffy Duck and Bugs Bunny
 Uncredited Dialogue written by Ben Washam
 Uncredited Animation by Abe Levitow and Richard Thompson
 Uncredited Orchestration by Milt Franklyn
 Film Edited by Treg Brown

History 

Duck Amuck is included in the compilation film The Bugs Bunny/Road Runner Movie, along with other Chuck Jones cartoons including What's Opera, Doc?

Mel Blanc performed the voices. It was directed by Chuck Jones with a story by Michael Maltese. The film contains many examples of self-referential humor, breaking the fourth wall. The cartoon's plot was essentially replicated in one of Jones' later cartoons, Rabbit Rampage (1955), in which Bugs Bunny turns out to be the victim of the sadistic animator (Elmer Fudd).

The 1980 television special Daffy Duck's Easter Egg-citement (notably directed & co-produced by Friz Freleng rather than Jones) features similar interactions between Daffy and an unseen animator in the opening credits and bridging sequences. A similar plot was also included in the episode "Duck's Reflucks" of Baby Looney Tunes, in which Bugs was the victim, Daffy was the animator, and it was made on a computer instead of a pencil and paper. It is done once again with Daffy tormenting Bugs in the New Looney Tunes episode "One Carroter in Search of an Artist" (for this reason, this version has garnered the alternative name "Rabbit Rampage II" among series fans) with the technology updated and the pencil and paintbrush replaced by a digital pen, the victim is Bugs Bunny and the animator is Daffy Duck. The ending of the Looney Tunes Cartoons short "Rage Rover", is a reference to the ending of Duck Amuck.

In issue #94 of the Looney Tunes comic, Bugs Bunny gets back at Daffy Duck by making him the victim, in switching various movie roles, from Duck Twacy in Who Killed Daffy Duck," a video game character, and a talk show host, and they always wind up with Daffy starring in Moby Dick (the story's running gag). After this, Bugs comments, "Eh, dis guy needs a new agent."

A Nintendo DS game was published based upon the short, where the player takes the role of the animator and is tasked with finding ways to anger Daffy. The game's ending, triggered once the player sufficiently enrages Daffy enough, reveals that the animator is another Daffy.

A 2021 segment of the Animaniacs revival series titled "Yakko Amakko" parodies the plot of Duck Amuck, with Yakko Warner explicitly referencing the original 1953 cartoon.

Reception 
In 1999 the film was deemed "culturally significant" by the United States Library of Congress and selected for preservation in the National Film Registry. This was the second of three animated shorts by Jones to receive this honor; the others are What's Opera, Doc? (1957) One Froggy Evening (1955) and Porky in wackyland (1938).

Animation historian Greg Ford writes, "The duck glowers directly at the camera, the eye contact always implicating us, the viewers, in the cartoon's gleeful sadism. While Mel Blanc's voice acting is masterful, writer Michael Maltese's gags are great, Maurice Noble's mismatched backgrounds are hilarious, and the Disney-derived yet highly defined 'stop and start' animation executed by Ken Harris is extra crispy here, the film belongs to Chuck Jones. It's as if the misadventures that Jones customarily plunged Daffy into throughout the decade have all converged in Duck Amuck."

See also 
 Rabbit Rampage, a similar cartoon where Elmer Fudd gets even with Bugs Bunny by being the animator in this short
 Looney Tunes and Merrie Melodies filmography (1950–1959)
 List of Daffy Duck cartoons
 List of Bugs Bunny cartoons

References

External links 

 Three Films by Chuck Jones: Duck Amuck, One Froggy Evening and What's Opera, Doc? essay by Craig Kausen on the National Film Registry website
 Duck Amuck essay by Daniel Eagan in America's Film Legacy: The Authoritative Guide to the Landmark Movies in the National Film Registry, A&C Black, 2010 , pages 467- 468
 
 
 Duck Amuck at Keyframe - the Animation Resource

American animated short films
1953 animated films
1953 short films
Merrie Melodies short films
Warner Bros. Cartoons animated short films
United States National Film Registry films
Metafictional works
Short films directed by Chuck Jones
Self-reflexive films
1950s English-language films
Films about animation
Daffy Duck films
Films scored by Carl Stalling
Surreal comedy films
Surrealist films
Bugs Bunny films
1950s Warner Bros. animated short films
Films with screenplays by Michael Maltese
Films about ducks
Animated films about birds